Chaetocarpus is a plant genus of the family Peraceae, formerly Euphorbiaceae, first described as a genus in 1854. Chaetocarpus species are trees or shrubs. They are native to the Americas, Africa, and Asia. Some species are endangered.

Species
 Chaetocarpus acutifolius (Britton & P.Wilson) Borhidi – Sierra de Moa in Cuba
 Chaetocarpus africanus Pax – C Africa
 Chaetocarpus castanocarpus (Roxb.) Thwaites – SE Asia, Yunnan, Assam, Bangladesh, Sri Lanka
 Chaetocarpus cordifolius (Urb.) Borhidi – Cuba, Hispaniola, Jamaica
 Chaetocarpus coriaceus Thwaites – Sri Lanka
 Chaetocarpus cubensis Fawc. & Rendle – Cuba
 Chaetocarpus echinocarpus (Baill.) Ducke – Bolivia, Brazil
 Chaetocarpus ferrugineus Philcox – Sri Lanka
 Chaetocarpus gabonensis Breteler – Gabon
 Chaetocarpus globosus (Sw.) Fawc. & Rendle – Jamaica, Cuba, Dominican Rep.
 Chaetocarpus myrsinites Baill. – Bolivia, Brazil
 Chaetocarpus parvifolius Borhidi – Cuba
 Chaetocarpus pearcei Rusby – Bolivia
 Chaetocarpus pubescens (Thwaites) Hook.f. – Sri Lanka
 Chaetocarpus rabaraba Capuron – Madagascar
 Chaetocarpus schomburgkianus (Kuntze) Pax & K.Hoffm. – Colombia, Venezuela, 3 Guianas, NW Brazil

member of homonymic genus, synonym of Pouteria 
Chaetocarpus pouteria J.F.Gmel, synonym of Pouteria guianensis Aubl. (Sapotaceae)

References
	

Peraceae
Malpighiales genera